Blackalls Park was a railway station in the suburb of Blackalls Park, on the former Fassifern - Toronto branch line in New South Wales, Australia.

The station was closed in 1990. The track and platform at the station is still largely intact, albeit overgrown.
it only has one platform. Since its closure, the station and its branch line have been converted into a rail-trail.

Image gallery

References

External links
 Blackalls Park (NSWrail.net)

Disused regional railway stations in New South Wales
City of Lake Macquarie
Railway stations in the Hunter Region
Railway stations in Australia opened in 1891
Railway stations closed in 1990